Airlie may refer to:

Places
In Canada
Airlie, Ontario, Canada

In Scotland
Airlie, Angus
Airlie Castle

In the United States
Airlie, Oregon
Airlie, Minnesota
Airlie, Virginia

People
Earl of Airlie, in the Peerage of Scotland
Andrew Airlie

Other uses
Airlie, South Yarra, Melbourne, Australia, a historic house
Airlie Beach, an inhabited place in Queensland, Australia
Airlie (Natchez), a historic house in Natchez, Mississippi, United States